Robert Grier Sr. (born 1933) is a former college football player for Pitt. In 1956, he was the first African American football player to break the color barrier of the United States collegiate Sugar Bowl game, which was held in New Orleans.  Particularly in the deep South, the mid-1950s was a period of strident racial segregation for sports, as well as other areas of life.  At the time, Grier's participation as a fullback and linebacker against a segregated all-white team on such a prestigious "stage" was a tremendously significant event.

Biography
Grier grew up in Massillon, Ohio and began playing football for the pro team Massillon Tigers his senior year in high school before playing college football at Pittsburgh. Grier later joined the Air Force for a number of years. He retired from military service to be an administrator at a Pittsburgh community college and is still active in the Pittsburgh community. In 2009, was named a Washington High School Distinguished Citizen and later added to the Massillon Tiger Wall of Champions. In 2022 Grier's story along with his family was featured in a documentary called Sky Blossom produced by Richard Lui. In October 2022, Bobby Grier was Enshrined in Pitt Athletics Hall at Heinz Field. Pitt's Director of Athletics Heather Lyke said "Bobby Grier is a richly deserving honoree in our Pitt Athletics Hall of Fame". Grier and his son are closely involved with the Elizabeth Dole Foundation. His story has been featured on CNBC, History Channel, ESPN, The New York Times, and other media networks.

1956 Sugar Bowl

Much controversy preceded the 1956 Sugar Bowl, where Grier's Pitt Panthers would meet the Yellow Jackets from Georgia Tech. There was controversy over whether Grier should be allowed to play, and whether Georgia Tech would participate in the contest.  Georgia Governor Marvin Griffin was very publicly opposed to racial integration. A measure for the tenor of this time period is the well-known case of Emmett Till being subjected to a lynching in Mississippi, which occurred the previous summer to the 1956 game.   Additionally, in the month prior, Rosa Parks ignited the Montgomery bus boycott, where she, in protest, refused to relinquish her seat on a Montgomery, Alabama transit bus.

A large contingent from the New Orleans community, as well as many connected with Georgia Tech, openly fought to bar either Grier, Pitt, or the Yellow Jacket team from the game. Georgia Tech's president, coach, students, and football players from the Atlanta-based school, civil rights leaders from multiple locales, as well as a large number of the Pitt community, however, succeeded in seeing Grier take to the gridiron that January day.

In anticipation of Grier's presence against Georgia Tech, Georgia governor Marvin Griffin in December 1955 publicly sent a telegram to his state's Board Of Regents imploring that teams from Georgia not engage in racially integrated events which had blacks either as participants or in the stands. Georgia Tech's president Blake Ragsdale Van Leer rejected this request. Griffin would later request that President Van Leer and Georgia Tech's players be punished, but Van Leer stuck to his statements, threatened to resign and later received a standing ovation from the faculty senate. Van Leer's stance would typically would not serve an administrator in a Deep South institution well in the 1950s, however the prospect of any long-term professional consequences proved moot since he died of a heart attack only three weeks after the fateful bowl game.

Georgia Tech won the game 7-0. The margin of victory mostly resulted from a disputed first quarter 31-yard pass interference penalty which was called on Grier, giving Georgia Tech a first and goal on the Pitt 1-yard line.  The Yellow Jackets scored the game's only touchdown on the next play. Photographic evidence later strongly indicated the referee's call was incorrect.

The irony of the bad call is that it was made by referee Rusty Coles, from the Pittsburgh area, who had no objective in making the wrong call, but simply made a mistake, which he admitted after seeing the game films.

Grier finished the game as its leading rusher with 51 yards.  After the game, he protested the pass interference call, but praised the Georgia Tech players, saying "They were good sportsmen, perhaps the best I've played against all season. They played hard, but clean. It was a good game. But believe me. I didn't push that man."

Grier's participation in the 1956 Sugar Bowl, as well as the support he received from various communities, is seen by some experts as a milestone in American race relations.

In 2019, Grier was elected as a member of the Sugar Bowl Hall of Fame.

See also
 Pittsburgh Panthers football
 1956 Sugar Bowl

References

Zeise, Paul - Bobby Grier broke bowl's color line. The Panthers' Bobby Grier was the first African-American to play in Sugar Bowl Pittsburgh Post-Gazette, October 7, 2005
Pete Thamel - Grier Integrated a Game and Earned the World's Respect. New York Times, Published: January 1, 2006.

1933 births
Living people
American football fullbacks
American football linebackers
Pittsburgh Panthers football players
Sportspeople from Massillon, Ohio
Players of American football from Ohio
African-American players of American football
21st-century African-American people
20th-century African-American sportspeople